Black swift may refer to several species of birds, including:

 African black swift, found in sub-Saharan Africa
 American black swift, found in North America

See also
 Malagasy black swift

Birds by common name